Livvi-Karelian (Alternate names: Liygi, Livvi, Livvikovian, Olonets, Southern Olonetsian, Karelian) is a dialect of the Karelian language, which is a Finnic language of the Uralic family, spoken by Olonets Karelians (self-appellation), traditionally inhabiting the area between Ladoga and Onega lakes, northward of Svir River. The name "Olonets Karelians" is derived from the territory inhabited, Olonets Krai, named after the town of Olonets, named after the Olonka River.

History
Before World War II, Livvi-Karelian was spoken both in Russia and in Finland, in the easternmost part of Finnish Karelia. After Finland was forced to cede large parts of Karelia to the USSR after the war, the Finnish Livvi-Karelian population was resettled in Finland. Today there are still native speakers of Livvi-Karelian living scattered throughout Finland, but all areas in which Livvi-Karelian remains a community language are found in Russia.

Speakers of Livvi-Karelian may be found mainly in Olonetsky, Pryazhinsky, Pitkyarantsky, and partly Suoyarvsky districts of the Republic of Karelia.

Livvi-Karelian long remained relatively uninfluenced by the Russian language despite the large influx of Russians following the founding of Saint Petersburg in 1703.

Phonology

Vowels

Consonants 

 Consonants may also occur as geminated or long .
 Sounds  are commonly heard from Russian loanwords.
 Palatalization  may occur among different dialects when consonants are preceding vowels .

See also
Olonets
Birch bark letter no. 292

References

External links

 Oma Mua – a weekly newspaper in Olonets Karelian 
 Livvi language resources at Giellatekno

Finnic languages
Languages of Finland
Languages of Russia
Karelian language